Blinkers, sometimes known as blinders, are a piece of horse tack that prevent the horse seeing to the rear and, in some cases, to the side.

Description

Blinkers are usually made of leather or plastic cups placed on either side of a horse's eyes - attached either to a bridle or to an independent hood. Blinkers that have a peep hole cut in the back of the cup are known as visors.
Many racehorse trainers believe that blinkers keep horses focused on what is in front, encouraging them to pay attention to the race rather than to distractions such as crowds. Additionally,  driving horses commonly wear blinkers to keep them from being distracted or spooked, especially on crowded city streets. Most equestrian disciplines, other than racing and  harness competition, do not permit the use of blinkers at any time, under penalty of elimination. In racing, blinkers are usually seen attached to a synthetic hood placed under the bridle. In driving, they are attached to the bridle's cheekpieces.

Winkers and pacifiers

Sometimes, a "set of winkers" can refer to blinders, but winkers may also refer to a related item of tack, usually fleece tubes, that are placed on the cheekpieces of a bridle and work similarly to a shadow roll to limit a horse's range of rear vision. They do not restrict the horse's view as much as blinkers do.

In Australian thoroughbred horse racing, winkers, (fleece rolls that are placed around the bridle cheek straps) may be used. Also used in Australian racing are "pacifiers," which are a blinker-style hood with mesh eye-covers, thought by some to calm horses. They may be banned from use on wet days as they may clog up with mud.

British blinder
In the United Kingdom, a bag or cloth blindfold put over the head of a difficult horse while it is being handled (for example loaded into starting gates or mounted) is called a blinder.

Metaphorical use 
Both "blinker" and "blinder" are also used metaphorically to refer to people with an overly narrow focus or inability to see the larger picture. The term can be seen as implying "a limitation or obstruction to sight or discernment".

See also
Blinders (poultry)
Bridle
Equine vision
Glossary of Australian and New Zealand punting
Horse harness

References

Further reading
Saddlery and Harness Making" Edited by Paul N. Hasluck
Winker Styles: https://web.archive.org/web/20120209093955/http://www.asteriskhorsecollars.com.au/winkers.htm
Just Racing: http://www.justracing.com.au/index.php?artid=1867&catid=52&news_page=2

Headgear (horse)
Horse driving
Horse racing terminology